Herod of Chalcis (d. 48-49 CE), also known as Herod Pollio King of Chalcis, Herod V, and listed by the Jewish Encyclopedia as Herod II, was a son of Aristobulus IV, and the grandson of Herod the Great, Roman client king of Judaea. He was the brother of Herod Agrippa I and Herodias and ruled as the king of Chalcis in 41 - 48 CE.

Life
His first wife was his cousin, Mariamne. She bore him a son named Aristobulus, who also eventually became ruler of Chalcis.

After Mariamne's death, he married his niece Berenice, with whom he had two sons, Berenicianus and Hyrcanus.

Around 41 CE, at the request of his brother, Herod Agrippa, emperor Claudius granted him the rule of Chalcis, a territory north of Judaea, with the title of king. Three years later, after the death of his brother, he was also given responsibility for the Second Temple in Jerusalem, as well as the appointment of the Temple's High Priest. During the four years in which he exercised this right he appointed two high priests—Joseph, son of Camydus (44-46), and Ananias, son of Nedebeus (ca. 47-52).

He died in 48 CE. After his death the kingdom of Chalcis was given to Herod Agrippa II, but only as a tetrarchy.

Family tree

See also
 Herodian dynasty
 Herodian kingdom
 List of Hasmonean and Herodian rulers
 1st century in Lebanon

References

1st-century BC births
48 deaths
1st-century Jews
1st-century Herodian rulers
Jewish royalty
1st-century monarchs in the Middle East
Herodian dynasty